The Murray Harbour Range Lights are a set of range lights near Murray Harbour, Prince Edward Island, Canada. They were built in 1879, and are still active.

See also
List of lighthouses in Prince Edward Island

References

External links
Picture of Murray Harbour Range Rear Light
Picture of Murray Harbour Range Front Light
 Aids to Navigation Canadian Coast Guard

Lighthouses completed in 1879
Lighthouses in Prince Edward Island
Buildings and structures in Kings County, Prince Edward Island